Di Prisco is a surname. Notable people with this surname include:

 Joseph Di Prisco (born 1950), Italian-American poet, novelist, memoirist, book reviewer, and teacher
 Rom Di Prisco (born 1972), Canadian video game composer and producer